Howe Caverns is a cave in Howes Cave, Schoharie County, New York. Howe Caverns is a popular tourist attraction, providing visitors with a sense of caving or spelunking, without needing the advanced equipment and training usually associated with such adventures.

Howe Caverns is the second most visited natural attraction in New York State, after Niagara Falls.

Geology
The cave walls are composed mainly of two types of limestone (Coeymans and Manlius) from different periods in the Earth's early history, deposited hundreds of millions of years ago when the Atlantic Ocean stretched far inland. The cave contains an underground lake, called the Lake of Venus, as well as many speleothems.

Discovery and development

Howe Caverns is named after farmer Lester Howe, who discovered the cave on May 22, 1842, after noticing that his cows frequently gathered near bushes at the bottom of a hill on hot summer days. Behind the bushes, Howe found a strong, cool breeze emanating from a hole in the Earth. Howe proceeded to dig out and explore the cave with his friend and neighbor, Henry Wetsel, on whose land the cave entrance was located.

Howe opened the cave to eight-hour public tours in 1843, and, as business grew, a hotel was built over the entrance. When Howe encountered financial difficulties, he sold off parts of his property until a limestone quarry purchased the remainder. The quarry's purchase included the hillside, which encompassed the cave's natural entrance. 

Eventually, the cave was closed to the public, until an organization was formed in 1927 to reopen it. The organization spent the next two years undertaking development work to create an alternative entrance into the cave. After completion of the work – including elevators, brick walkways, lighting, and handrails – the cave was reopened to visitors on Memorial Day, May 1929.

Developments since 2000
In 2008, the cave was purchased by private owners. In 2011, an adventure park attraction was assembled at the site, and it has been expanded since then.

In May 2015, Howe Caverns officials re-opened the natural entrance of the cave to public tours. The newly-opened section of the cavern had not been seen since 1900, as the property had been owned by a succession of cement companies since the late 1800s.

Howe Caverns has several tours, including a 90 minute walking tour with a boat ride and a two-and-a-half hour spelunking tour. The expanded tour features the remains of Howe's original tourist boat and signatures in the rock left by 19th-century cavern visitors.

Howe Caverns is also a wedding venue. Weddings are performed atop a heart-shaped calcite formation in the cave.

References

External links
 Cave House Museum of Mining & Geology
 BSA Scavenger Hunt Info

Caves of New York (state)
Limestone caves
Show caves in the United States
Landforms of Schoharie County, New York
Tourist attractions in Schoharie County, New York
Museums in Schoharie County, New York
Natural history museums in New York (state)
Geology museums in New York (state)